Armorial des comtes romains is an 1890 book about papal counts in France from 1815 to 1890, authored by Viscount Louis de Magny.

See also
Books in France
Catholic Church in France
French literature

References

External links
E-book on the Bibliothèque nationale de France

1890 non-fiction books
French-language books
Papal counts